Maayke Tjin-A-Lim (born 10 January 1998) is a Dutch track and field athlete who competes over sprint hurdles.

Career
From Hoorn, Tijn-A-Lim runs for the athletics club AV Zaanland, based in Zaandam. In February 2022 she came third at the Dutch Indoor Championships over 60m hurdles and qualified for the 2022 World Athletics Indoor Championships in Belgrade, where she reached the semi-finals. In doing so she set a new personal best time of 8.21 seconds. 

In May 2022 she also set a new personal best time over 100m hurdles, running 13.16. At the end of May 2022 Tjin A-Lim lowered her personal best again, to 13.02 in Manchester. In August 2022 Tijn-A-Lim competed in the 100m hurdles at the 2022 European Athletics Championships in Munich, where she reached the semi-finals.

In January 2023, racing indoors in Luxembourg she set a new personal best over 60m hurdles of 8.00. At the 2023 European Athletics Indoor Championships in Istanbul in March 2023, she successfully came through the heats and semi-final and qualified for the final.

Personal life
Tijn-A-Lim has discussed overcoming the eating disorder bulimia early in her career.

References

External links

1998 births
Living people
Dutch female hurdlers
Sportspeople from North Holland
21st-century Dutch women